The Pongaroa River is a river of the southern Manawatū-Whanganui region of New Zealand's North Island. It flows southeast from the Puketoi Range west of Pahiatua, reaching the Owahanga River 15 kilometres from the latter's outflow into the Pacific Ocean.

See also
List of rivers of New Zealand

References

Rivers of Manawatū-Whanganui
Rivers of New Zealand